The 2018–19 Clemson Tigers women's basketball team represents Clemson University during the 2018–19 college basketball season. The Tigers are led by first year head coach Amanda Butler. The Tigers, members of the Atlantic Coast Conference, play their home games at Littlejohn Coliseum. They finished the season 20–13, 9–7 in ACC play to finish in seventh place. They advanced to the quarterfinals of the ACC women's tournament where they lost to Louisville. They received an at-large bid of the NCAA women's tournament, which was their first trip 2002 where they defeated South Dakota in the first round before losing to Mississippi State in the second round.

During the off-season it was announced that Amanda Butler would be taking over as head coach for Audra Smith.

Previous season
The Tigers finished the 2017–18 season 11–19, 1–15 in ACC play to finish in fifteenth place. They lost to Georgia Tech in the first round of the ACC tournament.  After this season, head coach Audra Smith was fired.

Offseason

2018 recruiting class

Source:

Roster
Source:

Schedule
Source: 

|-
!colspan=9 style="background:#522D80; color:#F66733;"| Exhibition

|-
!colspan=9 style="background:#522D80; color:#F66733;"| Non-conference regular season

|-
!colspan=9 style="background:#522D80; color:#F66733;"| ACC regular season

|-
!colspan=9 style="background:#522D80; color:#F66733;"| ACC Women's Tournament

|-
!colspan=9 style="background:#522D80; color:#F66733;"| NCAA Women's Tournament

Rankings

See also
 2018–19 Clemson Tigers men's basketball team

References

Clemson Tigers women's basketball seasons
Clemson
Clemson Tigers
Clemson Tigers
Clemson